World Series of Fighting: Central America 2 - La Revancha was a mixed martial arts event held on  in Managua, Managua, Nicaragua.

Background

This was the second event the World Series of Fighting event held in Managua, Managua, Nicaragua. The event was headlined by former WBA/WBC Welterweight champion and the former WBC light middleweight champion Ricardo Mayorga taking on Sergio Ortiz.

Results

See also 
 World Series of Fighting
 List of WSOF champions
 List of WSOF events

References

World Series of Fighting events
2013 in mixed martial arts